Thaluthalaimedu is a village in the Udayarpalayam taluk of Ariyalur district, Tamil Nadu, India.

Demographics 

As per the 2001 census, Thaluthalaimedu had a total population of 4902 with 2487 males and 2415 females.

References 

Villages in Ariyalur district